Eva Van der Gucht (born 1 September 1977) is a Belgian actress.

Eva graduated in 2000 at the Amsterdam Theater and Drama academie. While studying she was selected  to star in the film Everybody's Famous! which was nominated for an Oscar for best foreign feature film in 2001.
After graduating Eva built a multi-faceted international career both in film, television and theater. On television Eva is known for series like S1ngle, Connie & Clyde, Den elfde van den elfde, Oogappels, Klokhuis, Hunter street and the improvisation program De vloer op.
After her starring role in Everybody famous Eva played in several films like Kursk, The Family Claus, Amnesia, North Sea Texas, Cool kids don’t cry, Dik Trom, Hallo Bungalow, Oude liefde and many others.
In the theater Eva starred in different plays from Shakespeare to Chekhov with the following theatre companies:  Het RoTheater, Orkater, de Toneelmakerij, Oostpool, de Spelerij and many more. 
She has appeared in more than forty films since 2000.

Selected filmography

References

External links 

1977 births
Living people
Belgian film actresses
Belgian television actresses
Flemish film actresses
Flemish television actresses
People from Mortsel
dutch actors
Dutch film actresses
Dutch television actresses
dutch television actors